Bundsen is a surname. Notable people with the surname include: 

Jes Bundsen (1766–1829), Danish artist
Johanna Bundsen (born 1991), Swedish handball player 
Victoria Bundsen (1839–1909), Swedish opera singer

See also
Bunsen